The North Belfast derby is the name given to football matches between Cliftonville and Crusaders who play in Belfast, Northern Ireland. The two are separated by around 1.5 miles with Cliftonville based at Solitude on Cliftonville Road and Crusaders at Seaview on the Shore Road.

The rivalry between the two clubs began in 1949 with Crusaders' ascension to senior football. For the majority of years the rivalry was simply competitive and geographical. The rivalry was heightened during The Troubles, and as the religious and political demographics within Belfast changed, Cliftonville began to develop a mainly nationalist following and Crusaders a unionist following. While there have been unsavoury incidents in the past between the clubs and the rivalry is fierce and intense on the pitch, off the pitch they have developed a strong cross-community relationship in recent years.

The two sides have met each other on 306 occasions, and have met in three national cup finals (the 2009 Irish Cup final, 2013 League Cup final and 2014 League Cup final) and one regional cup final (the 1979 County Antrim Shield final). The two sides have also won twelve league titles between them, five of these wins coming in six seasons; Cliftonville winning in 2012–13 and 2013–14, and Crusaders winning in 2014–15, 2015–16 and 2017–18.

Both clubs also share rivalries with the Belfast 'Big Two' of Glentoran and Linfield, but the success disparity between the pairs of clubs has seen two distinct rivalries formed.

History
Founded in 1879, Cliftonville are Ireland's oldest football team, and along with Distillery, Glentoran and Linfield were founder members of the Irish League, and are one of three teams never to have been relegated and to have competed in every top-flight season (along with Glentoran and Linfield). Although a major force in the first 20 years of Irish football their strict amateur status (not dropped until the early 1970s) meant they were also-rans for long periods once professionalism took hold. Once professional they added a cup win in 1979 and a league title in late 1990s.

Founded in 1898, Crusaders applied unsuccessfully for many years to join the Irish League and became one of the top junior sides in the country, but it was not until 1949-50 season following the resignation of Belfast Celtic they finally entered the league. They endured a tough start but became a major side during the 1960s, winning two Irish Cups, and also having successful spells in the 1970s and 1990s, winning two league titles in each decade.

The first match between the two clubs took place on 13 January 1923 in the first round of the County Antrim Shield at Solitude; this was also Crusaders first ever match in senior competition. The senior side of Cliftonville was too good for the intermediate Crusaders team, with the Reds recording a 1-0 victory. The first game between the two sides as senior teams took place in the Ulster Cup on 17 September 1949, finishing in a 2-2 draw at Solitude. The first league match and Boxing Day derby took place on 26 December 1949, with Cliftonville emerging victorious with a 5-0 victory at Seaview. In 1979 at the height of The Troubles, there were more than 1,900 police officers on duty for the Ulster Cup match on 21 September between Crusaders and Cliftonville at Seaview, more than has ever been recorded at a football match in the United Kingdom.

The sides first played each other in a cup final in 1978-79, with Cliftonville winning the County Antrim Shield in a penalty shoot-out, but with Glentoran and Linfield dominating Northern Irish football the sides did not reach a national cup final together until the 2008-09 season when they met in the final of the 2008–09 Irish Cup. Crusaders won the match 1–0 in front of 7,500 fans at Windsor Park. It would be not long before the two met again in a cup final as in the 2012-13 season with the sides first and second in the league table they played each other in the final of the 2012–13 Irish League Cup with Cliftonville emphatically winning 4–0 at Windsor Park. The following season they played again the League Cup Final but this time in a more cagey affair. Finishing 0–0 after extra time Cliftonville retained the cup with a 3–2 win on penalties.

A fixture during the 2012-13 season came to national media attention after a game was cancelled due to a Loyalist flag protest. Going into the fixture on 16 February 2013 Cliftonville led the Irish Premier League with a twelve-point lead, Crusaders in second had a game in hand and hoped a win over their rivals could see them falter. A small group of 20 flag protesters turned up half an hour before kick off and engaged in skirmishes with police. Around 2000 fans were in attendance but many supporters were unable to enter due to the protesters outside the turnstiles. The decision was made to cancel the game with condemnation of the protesters tactics and police's handling of the situation. Due to fixture congestion it was not rearranged until 22 April by which time Cliftonville had long won the title. Despite praise for both clubs during the incident further controversy emerged for the rearranged fixture when Crusaders on advice of the police only offered 200 tickets for away supporters (around 800 would be normal). Cliftonville fans issued a boycott of fixture (seven tickets were purchased, presumably to ticket stub collectors) leaving a completely empty away stand and total attendance of just 395.

In September 2018 the derby was chosen to be the first live NIFL Premiership match to be shown on BBC Two Northern Ireland, a part of a three year deal between BBC Sport NI, the Irish Football Association and Northern Ireland Football League.

Supporters
In the early to mid 20th century Cliftonville's support was less polarised and they were seen as a cross community team in comparison to Crusaders, who had traditionally been regarded as a Unionist club. During the Troubles the Cliftonville support came to be regarded as a nationalist club due to their location along the Cliftonville Road. With road blocks and cross community violence meaning that many away supporters no longer felt safe venturing to Solitude or Seaview. However, in recent years, with the streets safer than before, many supporters of both away teams choose to walk to their opponent's ground, given the close proximity of the grounds and the fact that both teams have largely local supports.

Despite the community differences the rivalry between supporters is fairly amicable and brings financial benefits to both clubs. A sell out league fixture can bring in an income of £30,000. As is the tradition with many other derbies in the Irish League, each season a fixture is played on Boxing Day, unless this day falls on a Sunday.

Head-to-head
In results between the two teams, Crusaders have 155 victories to Cliftonville's 87. Crusaders have won more games in the league, County Antrim Shield, Ulster Cup and the City Cup, whereas Cliftonville have won more head-to heads in the Irish Cup, League Cup, Setanta Sports Cup, Gold Cup and Belfast Charity Cup. It should also be noted that Cliftonville's amateur status meant that they were rarely competitive until the early 1970s, losing most of their games and finishing bottom of the table on several occasions.

By competition

Ulster Cup was renamed Festival of Britain Cup in 1952, so results are included in Ulster Cup total
All games that went to penalty shoot-outs counted as wins/losses

By venue

All games that went to penalty shoot-outs counted as wins/losses

Clubs' honours

Overall
In total, Cliftonville have won 47 senior honours to Crusaders' 30. Crusaders did not become a senior side until after World War II, and thus the only senior competitions they could enter from 1898 to 1949 were the Irish Cup (by invitation, having won the Irish Intermediate Cup or Intermediate League the season before) or the County Antrim Shield (again by invitation).

While Crusaders suffered relegation to intermediate football in 2005 for one season, Cliftonville have never lost senior status and have competed in every top-flight season since 1890.

 1 Includes other defunct senior trophies such as Belfast Charities Cup, Alhambra Cup, and Carlsberg Cup 
 (*) Includes 1 shared league title

Post-war
Since World War II (when both teams commenced competing at the same level), Crusaders have won 30 honours to Cliftonville's 20.

Results
All time results taken from Irish Football Club Project, British Newspaper Archive, and various other sources. Attendance figures from ifapremiership.com 

Key

League
Since 1949, the two sides have played each other in the domestic league at least twice every season, except for the 2005–06 season.

 1 Initial game on 2 January abandoned at 1–1

Irish Cup
The Irish Cup saw the teams meet in a national cup final for the first time ever in 2009.

 * Final, Semi-final played at/as a neutral venue, nominated as home side

League Cup
The Northern Ireland Football League Cup was established in 1986, with the first meeting between the sides coming in 1995, and the most recent in the 2014 final.

 * Final, Semi-final played at/as a neutral venue, nominated as home side

County Antrim Shield
The County Antrim Shield is a regional competition open to senior and intermediate clubs. Established in 1888, the tournament saw the first ever meeting between the sides in 1923, and the most recent meeting came in the quarter-finals in 2018.

 1 Cliftonville nominated as home side but game took place at Seaview

European playoffs
The two sides met each other for the first time in the NIFL Premiership European playoffs for a place in the 2021–22 UEFA Europa Conference League.

Setanta Cup
The Setanta Sports Cup was a cross-border competition open to clubs from all over Ireland, following on from previous competitions such as the Dublin and Belfast Inter-City Cup, North-South Cup, Blaxnit Cup, Texaco Cup, Tyler Cup and Irish News Cup. Having never played each other in any of these competitions, the Setanta Cup saw the only meeting of the two sides in all-Ireland competition in 2011. Established in 2005, the Setanta Cup was last played in 2014.

Gold Cup
The Gold Cup, is a now-defunct competition which was previously open to senior clubs from 1911 to 2001. The two sides first met in this competition in 1962 with the final meeting coming in 1987.

Ulster Cup
The Ulster Cup is also a now-defunct competition which was open to senior clubs from 1949 to 1997. Like the City Cup, the Ulster Cup was an annual fixture until the early 1980s (sometimes twice a season) when it was split into groups. Traditionally the opening competition of the season, this cup saw the first senior meeting of the clubs in 1949, with the last meeting between the two coming in 1997.

 * Tournament was renamed Festival of Britain Cup for one season
 1 Crusaders originally drawn at home, tie switched to Solitude to allow Seaview pitch to settle after re-turfing

City Cup
The City Cup is a now-defunct competition which ran from 1894 to 1976. Like the Ulster Cup, this was a fixture every season, and the sides played each other every season from 1949 until 1976.

 1 Game abandoned at 1-1 due to heavy rain, result declared complete

Belfast Charity Cup
The Belfast Charity Cup is a now-defunct competition which ran from 1883 to 1941, and was based on a similar tournament in Scotland, the Glasgow Merchants Charity Cup. The competition was open to senior sides from Belfast and while Cliftonville could enter every year, Crusaders could only enter this competition by winning an intermediate tournament or by invitation.

Goalscorer records
Players with 10 or more goals in the North Belfast derby. Those in bold still with either side.

 * Hale scored 18 goals for Crusaders and 3 goals for Cliftonville

Attendance records
Since the reorganisation of Irish football in 2008 clubs are required to publish attendances. Attendances in the 1960s and 1970s would have been considerably higher.

References 

Cliftonville F.C.
Crusaders F.C.
Northern Ireland football derbies
Sport in Belfast
Association football in Northern Ireland